Kevin Street  (born 25 November 1977) is an English footballer who played in the Football League as a midfielder for Crewe Alexandra, Luton Town, Bristol Rovers and Shrewsbury Town.

Playing career
Street, a strong passing spirit, began his career at Crewe Alexandra in 1997. After a loan move to Luton Town in 2001, he then joined Northwich Victoria in 2002 on a permanent deal before transfers to Bristol Rovers 2002–2003, Shrewsbury Town 2003–2005, Stafford Rangers 2005–2008, Altrincham 2008–2009, and Nantwich Town 2009–2011. In June 2011 he returned to Stafford Rangers in an attempt to gain a deal for the 2011–12 season and on 11 July signed a deal with the club. In late September during the 2012–2013 season he left the club by mutual consent. He later signed for Kidsgrove Athletic. In July 2014 he joined Alsager Town.

Managerial career
Street's first experience of management came in 2008 in a spell as joint caretaker manager with Neil Grayson at Stafford Rangers. In 2010, he became joint manager of Nantwich Town with Darren Tinson although they both left the club by mutual consent in March 2011.

References

External links

1977 births
Living people
Sportspeople from Crewe
English footballers
Association football midfielders
Crewe Alexandra F.C. players
Luton Town F.C. players
Northwich Victoria F.C. players
Bristol Rovers F.C. players
Shrewsbury Town F.C. players
Stafford Rangers F.C. players
Altrincham F.C. players
Nantwich Town F.C. players
Kidsgrove Athletic F.C. players
Alsager Town F.C. players
Whitchurch Alport F.C. players
Northern Premier League players
English Football League players
National League (English football) players
English football managers
Stafford Rangers F.C. managers
Nantwich Town F.C. managers